Cara Elizabeth Quici (born May 30, 1985) is an American singer, songwriter, and actress born and raised in Corpus Christi, Texas. She is living in New York City and Los Angeles  now.

Early life 
Quici began singing church hymns at the age of 4. She also participated in school musicals and band where she was the first-chair flautist.
Quici's family owned and operated a pro-sound, lighting, and DJ equipment business for over 30 years in Texas. Quici's father is a guitarist.

Career

Career beginnings 

As a teenager, Quici signed with Infinity Model and Talent Agency in Texas. She later competed at the International Modeling and Talent Association (IMTA) Convention in Hollywood, California, and at several Universal Cheerleaders Association competitions. On her 18th birthday, she moved to New York City, and later set up residence in Los Angeles, CA, splitting her time between the two cities.

2009-Present

Music 
Quici trained for her first professional recording sessions with Oksana Kolesnikova at the Oksana School of Music and Musician's Institute, and with Carol Rogers in Hollywood.

Quici has written over 30 songs with top producers and writers across the country. Her first single, "Away From You", was produced by Max Gousse and Billboard Hot 100 producer Fuego. "Away From You (Jump Smokers Remix)" reached the number 27 on the Dance Billboard charts.

Quici's unreleased songs "Adios", "OAI" and "Clone" were featured on four episodes of CMT's hit show Southern Nights.

Her single "Fight", a remake of the Beastie Boys' classic "Fight For Your Right (To Party)", was released in 2013 and became available on iTunes in 2014. The music video, featuring Dennis Rodman, reached over a million views within two weeks of its release. In February/March 2014, Quici was the number-one most active independent artist in US TOP 40 radio rotation for four weeks straight.

Quici releases her music through her own label, QMH Records. In early 2015, Quici began recording her debut EP.

Television appearances 
Quici was interviewed on the Playboy Morning Show in 2013.

In 2012, Quici appeared on Season 5 of The Real Housewives of New York City as the entertainment. She was also featured performing live in 2012 on Bravo TV's "Watch What Happens Live" hosted by Andy Cohen season 7, episode 22. She appeared in 2009 on The Millionaire Matchmaker, where she declared herself a Scientologist. 

She appeared on the Howard Stern show as a contestant for the "Dumb As a Rock" contest. She also portrayed a nurse on two episodes of Scrubs in 2009.

Press coverage 

Quici has been featured in Maxim, Esquire, and FHM.

Discography

Singles

References

External links 
 http://www.imdb.me/caraquici
 https://twitter.com/caraquici
 https://www.facebook.com/OfficialCara/
 https://www.youtube.com/user/CaraQuici
 https://soundcloud.com/caraquici
 https://musicazon.com/artist/cara-quici

American singer-songwriters
Living people
1985 births